One is a 2015 children's novel by Irish author Sarah Crossan.  The book was published by Bloomsbury Publishing on 27 August 2015.

The novel won the Carnegie Medal for 2016. It was also nominated for the Deutscher Jugendliteraturpreis in its German translation.

The plot of the book is about the life and survival of Tippi and Grace, two sisters who are ischiopagus tripus conjoined twins. The book was written following Crossan's research on twins and the book refers to past examples of conjoined twins. The book is written in a poetic format, unlike most other children's novels. It focuses on themes of identity and loss.

References

2015 Irish novels
2015 children's books
Irish young adult novels
Carnegie Medal in Literature winning works
Verse novels
Twins in fiction
Fictional conjoined twins
Bloomsbury Publishing books